The American Journal of Evaluation  is a peer-reviewed academic journal that covers research on methods of evaluation. It is a quarterly journal and its first publication was in 1981. The editor-in-chief is George Julnes.

The American Evaluation Association is a professional association where students, funders, managers, practitioners, faculty and government decision-makers can discuss about the different fields of evaluation. It cooperates with the American Journal of Evaluation when writing articles. The American Journal of Evaluation is published by SAGE Publications.

History 
The American Journal of Evaluation was for the very first time published in February 1981. Its first article was called “News of the network”. This first journal was composed of 25 articles and had approximately 100 pages.

SAGE Publications assumed publication of the journal in 2005. SAGE Publications decided, in 2005, to put an online version of the journal. All articles from 2005 on are available online and accessible to everyone on their official website.

SAGE Publications 
SAGE Publishing is an independent company which was created by Sara Miller McCune and Georges D. McDune in 1965. It has published more than 800 journals and 800 books including the American Journal of Evaluation. SAGE Publications is a worldwide company which has more than 1,500 employees mostly based in Los Angeles, London, New Delhi, Singapore and Washington DC.

It is a leading independent publisher since 1965 about scholarship and research. Its goal is to disseminate research teaching on a global scale and educate future generations. It began as a social sciences publisher because they believed in the importance of that discipline. They have expanded their topics into engineering and medicine, but most of people know SAGE Publications as the social sciences publisher in the world.

They are different from the other publishers as their belief is that research methods are not just something that schools around the world do but actually need to be informed about. Being an independent company is their main power; they always have a long-term view and can build sustainably for the future. SAGE Publications grows by taking risks such as making research and discourse analysis about the African phenomena. They are always trying to be visionaries in order to improve their quality of research.

SAGE books are mainly used by teachers who can improve their teaching methods thanks to analysis they can find in those books. Books are made in order to encourage students to develop their critical spirit. Furthermore, SAGE Publications works a lot with their authors because they want them to feel that the company cares about their books. They work in partnership with them so as to have a sustainable relation. They distribute their books all around the world and have international writers because they think that ideas shouldn’t be limited by geography.

For SAGE Publications, publishing is not only a commercial business but also a way to support social causes. For their future, they are creating new platforms for communication: Social media communities or new research tools to meet their partner’s needs. The two most important things to them are:
 Succeeding commercially
 Quality of the content and the impact of their publishing on the world at large

Purpose 
The American Journal of Evaluation gives an inside view of how to make an evaluation. They try to make everybody understand the making and the utility of an evaluation. Each tool used to make the evaluation is identified and explained by this journal. The American Journal of Evaluation helps to better understand this field of evaluation which can be misread as it is a very large and specific discipline. Moreover, it distinguishes the evaluations which are made by professionals and that people can trust and the others which are not based on relevant tools. It describes the different steps used by the experts to build their evaluation.

The American Journal of Evaluation also helps people to learn about the different subjects on which the evaluation is about. All of the articles are published in order to educate future generation and to utilise relevant teaching tools. Thus, the American Journal of Evaluation follows the SAGE Publications mentality.

Abstracting and indexing 
According to the Journal Citation Reports, for its first year of publication, in 2009, the American Journal of Evaluation had an impact factor of 0.942. It reached 1.16 in 2011 whereas in 201 the journal was ranking 33 out of 98 journals in the category  "Social Sciences, Interdisciplinary" with an impact factor of 0.965. Recent figures show that the impact factor was reaching 1.339 in 2017. The impact factor is a measure of the frequency with which the "average article" in a journal has been cited in a particular year or period.

References

External links 
 

SAGE Publishing academic journals
English-language journals
Business and management journals
Quarterly journals
Publications established in 1981